Falsohomaemota is a genus of longhorn beetles of the subfamily Lamiinae, containing the following species:

 Falsohomaemota monteithi Sudre & Vives, 2016
 Falsohomaemota novacaledonica Hayashi, 1961
 Falsohomaemota viridis Sudre, Vives, Mille & Bordon, 2013

References

Parmenini
Cerambycidae genera